Maple, Texas may refer to:

Maple, Bailey County, Texas
Maple, Red River County, Texas